Matricaria discoidea, commonly known as pineappleweed, wild chamomile, disc mayweed, and rayless mayweed, is an annual plant native to northeast Asia where it grows as a common herb of fields, gardens, and roadsides. It is in the family Asteraceae. The flowers exude a chamomile/pineapple aroma when crushed. They are edible and have been used in salads (although they may become bitter by the time the plant blooms) and to make herbal tea.

Description

The flower head is cone-shaped, composed of densely packed yellowish-green corollas, and lacking ray-florets. The leaves are pinnately dissected and sweet-scented when crushed. Flowerheads are produced from March to September.

Distribution and habitat
The plant grows well in disturbed areas, especially those with poor, compacted soil. It can be seen blooming on footpaths, roadsides, and similar places in spring and early summer. In North America, it can be found from central Alaska down to California and all the way to Nova Scotia and Newfoundland. It has also become common and naturalized in Britain.

Native
Palearctic
Russian Far East: Amur Oblast, Kamchatka Peninsula, Khabarovsk Krai, Kuril Islands, Magadan Oblast, Primorsky Krai, Sakhalin
Eastern Asia: Hokkaido

Uses 
The greens can be washed and eaten, and both the flowers and the whole plant can be steeped to make tea, described as excellent by one field guide.

Gallery

References

External links

USDA Plants Profile for Matricaria discoidea (Disc mayweed, Pineapple weed)
 Jepson Manual treatment: for Chamomilla suaveolens —Matricaria discoidea
 University of Michigan Native American Ethnobotany — Matricaria discoidea
 Pineapple weed - Matricaria discoidea
 Robbins, W. W., Margaret K. Bellue, and Walter S. Ball. 1970. Weeds of California. Documents and Publications, Sacramento. 547 p.
 Gregory L. Tilford. 1997. Edible and Medicinal Plants of the West. Mountain Press Publishing Company, Missoula. 110 p.
 University of California-Davis, Statewide Integrated Pest Management Program — 'Pineapple weed'
 Den virtuella floran: Matricaria discoidea distribution
 
 

Matricaria
Edible plants
Flora of Northeast Asia
Flora of Japan
Flora of Alaska
Flora of Yukon
Flora of Alberta
Flora of British Columbia
Flora of the Northwestern United States
Flora of the Southwestern United States
Flora of the Sierra Nevada (United States)
Flora of California
Flora of Baja California
Taxa named by Augustin Pyramus de Candolle
Flora without expected TNC conservation status